Gordon Paiea Chung-Hoon (July 25, 1910 – July 24, 1979) was an admiral in the United States Navy, who served during World War II and was the first Asian American flag officer.

Early life

He was born in Honolulu, Hawaii, on July 25, 1910. His father, William Chung-Hoon Jr., a Chinese-English-Hawaiian, was a county treasurer and his mother Agnes Punana, a Hawaiian, was a member of the Kaʻahumanu Society. Chung-Hoon was the fourth of five children born to his family. He graduated from Punahou School in 1929.

Military career
Chung-Hoon attended the United States Naval Academy and graduated in May 1934, becoming the first Asian American graduate of the academy. While a student he gained national prominence as the football team's halfback and punter, and in 1934 starred on the team that broke an 11-year winless streak against the Army team. In 1958 Sports Illustrated'''s Silver Anniversary All-American issue featured Chung-Hoon as one of its 1933 football stars.

After graduation Chung-Hoon was assigned to the cruiser  as an ensign. As of January 1937 he was serving as an ensign aboard the destroyer .

World War II

Chung-Hoon served on the battleship  as a lieutenant, but was in Honolulu on a weekend pass during the attack on Pearl Harbor. Chung-Hoon heard the attack from Honolulu and attempted to return to his ship but was delayed by roadblocks and traffic jams. By the time he reached the Arizona the ship had already exploded and sunk.

After the sinking of Arizona, Chung-Hoon served as a naval liaison officer with coastal artillery before becoming executive officer on a destroyer in 1942, working convoy details in the Atlantic. He also served on board the cruiser .

From May 1944 to October 1945 Chung-Hoon commanded the destroyer . In the spring of 1945, Sigsbee assisted in the destruction of 20 enemy planes while screening an aircraft carrier strike force off the Japanese island of Kyūshū. Despite the damage, then Commander Chung-Hoon kept his antiaircraft batteries delivering "prolonged and effective fire" against the continuing Japanese air attack while simultaneously directing the damage control efforts that allowed Sigsbee to make port under her own power.

The damage had been severe enough that Admiral William Halsey, Jr. told Chung-Hoon to scuttle the ship. However, Chung-Hoon declined to do so, telling the admiral "No, I have kids on here that can't swim and I'm not putting them in the water. I'll take her back."

The next day Chung-Hoon led a burial at sea for the dead. One crewmate said of Chung-Hoon during the burial, "I often remember that the only man tough enough not to duck, was also the only man tender enough to cry."

For Chung-Hoon's service aboard Sigsbee he received the Navy Cross and the Silver Star for conspicuous gallantry and extraordinary heroism.

During the war, two of Chung-Hoon's brothers served in the army in the Pacific theater.

Postwar 

After Sigsbee was inactivated following the end of the war, Chung-Hoon was transferred to Pearl Harbor in November as officer in charge of the Special Activities Division of Service Force, Pacific Fleet, responsible for various administrative duties.

From August 16, 1950, to March 7, 1952, Chung-Hoon commanded the destroyer  during the Korean War. Under Chung-Hoon's command the destroyer operated as part of the 7th Fleet, patrolling off the coast of Korea and taking part in gun bombardments.

He was promoted to the rank of captain on 1 July 1953.

Chung-Hoon served as captain of the guided missile testing ship  between July 1956 and August 1957. He was subsequently transferred to the Office of the Chief of Naval Operations in Washington, D.C., his last post. Chung-Hoon retired in October 1959 and was promoted to rear admiral upon retirement, making him the first Asian American flag officer of the United States Navy.

Later life and legacy

He was appointed to be the director of the Hawaii Department of Agriculture by the first Governor of the State of Hawaii, William F. Quinn, and held that position between January 1961 and June 1963. Chung-Hoon subsequently worked as a Realtor. He made a foray into politics by running as a Republican for one of the four seats representing the Hawaii 7th State Senate District in 1966, but finished fifth in the primary. Chung-Hoon died on July 24, 1979, at Tripler Army Medical Center in Honolulu.

The  , commissioned in 2004, is named for him.

 Personal life 
Chung-Hoon first married Anita Corson while serving aboard Dent'' in December 1938; she died of cancer in 1950.  He married Ola Luckey in 1952; she died of cancer in April 1960, months after they had returned to Honolulu following his retirement; Chung-Hoon retired in order to spend more time with his wife. He married his third wife, travel consultant Jean Carlisle (died 2001), in January 1961, adopting her son, Perry White; Chung-Hoon was otherwise childless.

Navy Cross citation

References

External links
 United States Navy biography 
 "Lest We Forget", By Lieutenant Commander Thomas J. Cutler & Arthur D. Baker III. Proceedings, November 2004 

1910 births
1979 deaths
American football halfbacks
American football punters
American military personnel of Chinese descent
United States Navy personnel of World War II
Recipients of the Navy Cross (United States)
Recipients of the Silver Star
Navy Midshipmen football players
Punahou School alumni
United States Naval Academy alumni
United States Navy rear admirals
Agriculture in Hawaii
People from Honolulu
American military personnel of Native Hawaiian descent
American people of English descent
United States Navy personnel of the Korean War
American real estate brokers